Gun drills (through coolant drill) are straight fluted drills which allow cutting fluid (either compressed air or a suitable liquid) to be injected through the drill's hollow body to the cutting face. They are used for deep hole drilling—a depth-to-diameter ratio of 300:1 or more is possible. Gun barrels are the obvious example; hence the name. Other uses include moldmaking, diemaking, and the manufacture of combustion engine parts such as crankcase, cylinder head, and woodwind musical instruments, such as uilleann pipes, as gun drills can drill long straight holes in metal, wood, and some plastics. The coolant provides lubrication and cooling to the cutting edges and removes the swarf or chips from the hole. Modern gun drills use carbide tips to prolong life and reduce total cost when compared with steel tips. Speed of drilling depends on the material being drilled, rotational speed, and the drill diameter; a high speed drill can cut a hole in  P20 steel at 30 inches per minute.

Gun drilling can be done on several kinds of machine tools. On lathes, it is generally practical with hole depths of less than 50 diameters. There are also purpose-built gun drilling machines, where longer aspect ratios can be drilled.

Requirement
With a standard twist drill, it is difficult to drill a straight and accurately sized hole of a depth more than about 5 times the diameter. This is a problem in many manufacturing processes, especially the firearms industry: the barrel of a gun must be very straight and accurately sized. The gun drill was developed to drill such long, straight holes.

Gun drilling is possible over a range of depths and diameters. It is also possible for the  range, however less efficient than BTA deep hole drilling.

Types

 
There are three basic types of deep hole drilling.  Processes are categorized by how the cutting coolant flushes heat and chips from the cutting face. The three types of deep drilling are:

 Gun drilling - The cutting tool is a fluted solid rod that has a hole bored down the center. Coolant is pumped through a hole in the inside of the drill. It flows back outside the drill, through the flute, bringing the chips with it.
 BTA / STS (Boring and Trepanning Association / Single Tube System) - The cutting tool is a tube. Coolant is pumped in around the outside of the cutting tool and carries chips out through the center tube.
 Ejector system - The cutting tool is a tube with another tube nested inside. Coolant flows through the smaller tube to the cutting face and then coolant and chips flow back through the larger tube.

References

Further reading
 [Machinery editors]. (1910) Deep hole drilling, 2nd edition. Machinery's Reference Series Number 25. A small monograph on gun drilling practice as of 1910. Compiled as part of a series by the editors of the journal Machinery by revising and republishing information from the journal. Reprinted, along with 2 other Machinery articles on deep hole drilling from 1926 and 1927, by Lindsay Publications, Inc, .

External links
Lilja article on rifle barrel drilling
Gun drill article on definition and applications of gundrilling

Firearm construction
Hole making